Virgin Annunciate may refer to two paintings by the Italian Renaissance artist Antonello da Messina:
 Virgin Annunciate (Antonello da Messina, Munich), painted in 1473
 Virgin Annunciate (Antonello da Messina, Palermo), probably painted in 1476

See also
 Annunciation